Vettikkavala is a village located in the Kollam district in the state of Kerala, India. One point of interest within the village is a Shiva-Vishnu temple which hosts a special deity called Vathukkal Njali Kunju. An annual celebration of Pongala is held at the temple. The village is also well known for temple arts (kshetra kala) and a palace constructed by Sree Moolam Thirunal.

Demographics
 India census, Vettikkavala has a population of 20,118 with 5,313 households. The majority of the population identifies as Hindu; Christians are a religious minority. Scheduled Castes make up 17.02% of the total population; 0.12% of the population are Scheduled Tribes.

Administration and Politics 

Vettikkavala is a Gram panchayat in the Kottarakara Taluk of Kollam district in Kerala. 

The administration of Vettikkavala consists of a three-tiered, local self-government consistent with the Panchayati Raj System. 

The Kollam district is divided into 11 Block Panchayats, 69 Grama Panchayats, one corporation and four municipalities. Vettikkavala is one among the 11 Block Panchayats. The village has an executive head who is a block development officer and an elected Panchayat Samiti (block).

Six Gram panchayats are included in the block: Vettikkavala, Melila, Mylam, Kulakkada, Pavithreswaram and Ummannur. Vettikkavala Grama Panchayat includes 21 wards.

Vettikkavala is part of the Mavelikara (Lok Sabha constituency) and in the state legislature, it forms part of Pathanapuram legislative seat. The Panchayat's major political players are Communist Party of India (Marxist), Indian National Congress and the Bharatiya Janata Party.

Attractions and Notable Locations

Vettikkavala Sree Mahadevar temple 

http://www.vettikkavalatemple.com/

Vettikkavala Sree Mahadevar temple is one of the largest and most famous Shiva-Vishnu temples in Kerala region. Early forms of idol worship beneath a Vetti tree suggest an origin to the name of the village. According to local historians, this tree was roughly situated near the present-day government school. Based on available records, in around the 17th or 18th century, a temple was constructed near the tree by the queen of Elayadath Swaroopam. The Elayadath Swaroopam centered at Kottarakkara was brought under Travancore in 1742 by troops of Marthanda Varma as a result of Travancore–Dutch War. The temple remained in a dilapidated state for many years after the annexation. However, in 1900 (Malayalam era 1176), and under the insistence of palace manager Sankaran Thampi the king of Travancore, Moolam Thirunal renovated the temple into its current structure.

The Travancore Devaswom Board made a major investment in restoring the temple. In 1996, another round of maintenance was undertaken. During this work, a portion of kulikadavu around the temple pond was inadvertently damaged.

On the southern side of the temple lies a palace constructed by Travancore kings during the reign of Moolam Thirunal. This palace was designed for kings and royal family members who were visiting the adjacent temple. Presently, weather and encroaching vegetation are leading the temple into further ruin.

Other Religious Places 

 Ancient Sadananda Ashram, Sadanandapuram
 Kannamcode Sree Subrahmanya Swami Temple
 Edamana Madom Sree Bhagavathy Trust Raktheshwari Kudumba Paradevatha Temple
 Koikkal Sree Dharma Sastha Temple
 Villur Vaikuntanatha Temple
 Chirattakonam Church
Thalachira Mosque
 India Pentecostal Church of God
 Assemblies of God in India
The Pentecostal Mission
APA'''
Kattalanchavarkavu pachoor
Bethel Marthoma Church, Panavely

Tourist Attractions 

 Kallada Irrigation Project
 KTDC Motel Aaram, Sadanandapuram
 Pinnacle View Point
 Kazhuvudayan kunnu, Pachoor
 Muttamala

Educational Institutions 
Vettikavala Government Model High School is a high-tech, high-achieving secondary school. Another higher secondary school is in Sadanandapuram and is also high achieving academically. High schools are situated in Thalachira, Chakkuvarakkal, Kottavattom and are at a good level. Some lp, up, and welfare schools are also run by the government. Sector and some aided schools are also run by the private sector. There is also a polytechnic college in Thalachira.

Govt Model Higher Secondary School Vettikavala
Govt High School Thalachira
Govt Higher Secondary School Sadanandapuram
Govt high school chakkuvarakkal
D Krishnan Potti Memorial High School Kottavattom
Travancore Devaswom Board School Vettikavala
Mar baselios ocean star public school Chirattakonam
SDA school Karickom
Karickam international public school
Aala achan memorial English medium school Thalachira
Younus polytechnic college Thalachira

Transportation

Road
State-run KSRTC buses are the primary form of transportation. The village is well connected to Kottarakkara, Kokkadu, Thalachira, Chakkuvarakkal and Punalur through frequent bus services. Two daily KSRTC Fast Passenger bus services ensure connectivity to neighboring districts of Pathanamthitta and Thiruvananthapuram.

 Kollam - Tirumangalam NH 744 passes through Chengamanad which is situated 2 km away.

 Pathanapuram - Valakom (Mc road) Sabarimala Bypass pass through Vettikkavala.

 Kadakkal-Chengamanad road is another important road passing through Vettikkavala that connects Vettikkavala with Anchal.

Rail
The Kottarakara and Avaneeswaram railway stations, located on the Kollam-Sengottai railway line, are the nearest stations. Both of them are 8 km from Vettikkavala. However, Vettikkavala is better connected with Kottarakkara railway station through public transportation.

Air
The nearest airport is Trivandrum International Airport (68 km).

See also 
Kollam

References

Villages in Kollam district